Eranthis hyemalis, the winter aconite, is a species of flowering plant in the buttercup family Ranunculaceae, native to calcareous woodland habitats in France, Italy and the Balkans, and widely naturalized elsewhere in Europe.

Description
The six sepals are bright yellow and petaloid, and the petals are in the form of tubular nectaries. There are numerous stamens and usually six unfused carpels. The fruit are follicles each containing several seeds.

As a spring ephemeral plant, its life cycle exploits the deciduous woodland canopy, flowering at the time of maximum sunlight reaching the forest floor, then completely dying back to its underground tuber after flowering.

Names
The Latin specific epithet hyemalis means "winter-flowering", while the name of the genus is a compound of the Greek elements Er 'Spring' and anthos 'flower' - so named for its early flowering.

Cultivation
The plant is valued in cultivation as one of the earliest of all flowers to appear. E. hyemalis and the sterile hybrid cultivar 'Guinea Gold' have both gained the Royal Horticultural Society's Award of Garden Merit.

Toxicity
All parts of the plant are poisonous when consumed by humans and other mammals, because it contains cardiac glycosides similar to those present in Adonis vernalis. Glycosides of this type stimulate the heart when administered in small doses, but in very large doses may cause serious, often irreparable heart damage. Symptoms of poisoning include colicky abdominal pains, nausea, vomiting, diarrhoea, disturbed vision, dyspnea, bradycardia and, in severe cases, cardiac arrest. Specific cardiac glycosides present in E.hyemalis include Eranthin A and B, belonging to the bufadienolide group, found also in (and named for) the toad venom bufotoxin.

References

External links

 IPNI Eranthis hyemalis Salisb.

Ranunculaceae